Richland Township is a township in Kingman County, Kansas, USA.  As of the 2000 census, its population was 100.

Geography
Richland Township covers an area of 36.59 square miles (94.76 square kilometers); of this, 0.07 square miles (0.17 square kilometers) or 0.18 percent is water.

Unincorporated towns
 Basil
 Cleveland
(This list is based on USGS data and may include former settlements.)

Adjacent townships
 Dale Township (northeast)
 Eagle Township (east)
 Canton Township (southeast)
 Valley Township (south)
 Chikaskia Township (southwest)
 Belmont Township (west)
 Ninnescah Township (north and northwest)

Cemeteries
The township contains one cemetery, Hunt.

Major highways
 K-14 (Kansas highway)

Airports and landing strips
 Handkins Landing Strip

References
 U.S. Board on Geographic Names (GNIS)
 United States Census Bureau cartographic boundary files

External links
 US-Counties.com
 City-Data.com

Townships in Kingman County, Kansas
Townships in Kansas